The Moroccan Philharmonic Orchestra (French: Orchestre Philharmonique du Maroc) is Morocco's national symphony orchestra, which was established in August 1996.

References

http://www.synchronism.com/opm_temp/programme.php
http://www.concertspasdeloup.fr/Orchestre-philharmonique-du-Maroc.html
http://www.libe.ma/L-Orchestre-philharmonique-du-Maroc-fait-sa-rentree_a54033.html
https://www.facebook.com/ConcertsOPM
http://www.lavieeco.com/news/culture/la-grande-musique-a-le-blues-12902.html

African orchestras
Moroccan musical groups
1996 establishments in Morocco